Ghulam Nabi Wani, (also known as: Sogami Sahab, born 1916, Sogam Lolab), was a politician of Jammu and Kashmir. He is the grandfather of Nasir Aslam Wani. He represented Lolab as an MLA from 1951 to 1977.

Ministry
Ghulam Nabi Sogami was a Minister in Bakshi Ghulam Mohammad's Cabinet. He was a Cabinet Minister for Forests, Industries & Commerce, and Rural Development.

References

State cabinet ministers of Jammu and Kashmir
Jammu & Kashmir National Conference politicians
Indian National Congress politicians from Jammu and Kashmir
1916 births
1981 deaths